Wu Zhiqiang (born 1 August 1960) is a Chinese engineer who is a counsellor for Shanghai Municipal Government, a former vice president of Tongji University, and an academician of the Chinese Academy of Engineering.

Biography
Wu was born in Shanghai, on 1 August 1960. He received his Bachelor of Engineering degree and Master of Engineering degree from Tongji University in 1982 and 1982, respectively. After graduating in 1985, he stayed at the university and worked as an instructor. In April 1988, he pursued advanced studies in Germany, earning Doctor of Engineering degree from the Technical University of Berlin in 1994. After university, he was recruited by the Berlin Institute of City and Architecture as a senior researcher.

Wu returned to China in 1996 and continued to teach at Tongji University. In June 1996, he was appointed deputy dean of the School of Architecture and Urban Planning, rising to dean in 2003. After this office was terminated in September 2009, he became assistant to the president, serving until September 2011. He moved up the ranks to become vice president in October 2011. He also served as chief planner for Shanghai World Expo and Qingdao International Horticultural Exposition. In July 2021, he was hired by the Shanghai Municipal Government as a counsellor.

Honours and awards
 Academician of the Royal Swedish Academy of Engineering Sciences
 Fellow of the American Institute of Architects
 Fellow of the German Academy of Science and Engineering
 27 November 2017 Member of the Chinese Academy of Engineering (CAE)

References

1960 births
Living people
Engineers from Shanghai
Tongji University alumni
Academic staff of Tongji University
Technical University of Berlin alumni
Members of the Chinese Academy of Engineering